Lipantitlán State Historic Site is a  park located at FM 624 and 70 just east of Orange Grove in far northwestern Nueces County in the U.S. state of Texas.  Fort Lipantitlán, meaning "Lipan land" was named for the Lipan Apaches who once inhabited the area. The 1835 Battle of Lipantitlán between Mexican and Texian forces was fought here.

See also
List of Texas State Historic Sites
Battle of Lipantitlán

References

Texas state historic sites
Protected areas of Nueces County, Texas
Protected areas established in 1949
1949 establishments in Texas